Paul Michael Junior Okon-Engstler (born 24 January 2005) is a Belgian professional footballer who plays as a defender for Benfica.

Club career
Born in Belgium to former Australian international soccer player Paul Okon, who was playing for K.V. Oostende at the time, Okon-Engstler moved to Australia as a child, as his father had been signed by the Newcastle Jets. He started his career, as his father had, with Marconi Stallions, before moving to A-League side Western Sydney Wanderers. In 2019, he moved back to Belgium, signing with Club Brugge.

While representing Club Brugge at a youth tournament in Portugal, he was spotted by scouts from Benfica, despite Club Brugge's poor performances at the tournament. He joined the Portuguese club in July 2022, signing a three-year deal.

International career
Okon-Engstler is eligible to represent Belgium through birth, Australia through his father, and Italy through his mother. He holds Italian citizenship.

In September 2022, he was called up to the Australia under-20 team, but did not feature.

Style of play
A composed, left-footed centre-back, also capable of playing in midfield, Okon-Engstler is known for his range of long passes, and is capable of starting attacks from deep.

References

2005 births
Living people
Belgian footballers
Australian soccer players
Belgian people of Australian descent
Belgian people of Italian descent
Belgian people of German descent
Australian people of Italian descent
Australian people of German descent
Association football central defenders
Association football midfielders
Marconi Stallions FC players
Western Sydney Wanderers FC players
Club Brugge KV players
S.L. Benfica footballers
Australian expatriate soccer players
Italian expatriate footballers
Australian expatriate sportspeople in Portugal
Italian expatriate sportspeople in Portugal
Expatriate footballers in Portugal